Sheldon Country Park is a country park located in Sheldon, Birmingham, UK.

Located at the far eastern edge of the city, the park covers an area of just over 300 acres of grassland, wetland, hedgerows and mature woodland.

A small dairy farm dating from the 17th century, the Old Rectory, is located near the main entrance. The farm was home to the celebrated clergyman Thomas Bray between 1690 and 1721.

The park's other attractions include three football pitches, a children's play area and a viewing platform for the nearby Birmingham International airport.

Park rangers are also available to provide guided tours of the park.

References

Country parks in Birmingham, West Midlands